The 1987 Hexagon World Men's Curling Championship was held from March 30 to April 5 at B.C. Place Stadium  in Vancouver, British Columbia.

Teams
{| class="wikitable"
!bgcolor="#efefef" width="200"|
!bgcolor="#efefef" width="200"|
!bgcolor="#efefef" width="200"|
!bgcolor="#efefef" width="200"|
!bgcolor="#efefef" width="200"|
|-
| Penetang CC, Penetanguishene 
Skip: Russ Howard 
Third: Glenn Howard 
Second: Tim Belcourt 
Lead: Kent Carstairs 
Alternate: Larry Merkley
| Hvidovre CC, Hvidovre 
Skip: Gert Larsen 
Third: Oluf Olsen 
Second: Jan Hansen 
Lead: Michael Harry 
Alternate: Steen Hansen 
| Province of London CC, London  
Skip: Bob Martin 
Third: Ronnie Brock 
Second: John Brown 
Lead: Robin Gemmell 
Alternate: Phil Atherton 
| Megève CC, Megève 
Skip: Jean-Francois Orset 
Third: Claude Feige 
Second: Jean-Louis Sibuet
Lead: Marc Sibuet 
Alternate: Patrick Philippe 
| EV Oberstdorf, Oberstdorf 
Skip: Rodger Gustaf Schmidt 
Third: Wolfgang Burba 
Second: Johnny Jahr 
Lead: Hans-Joachim Burba 
Alternate: Philip Seitz
|-
!bgcolor="#efefef" width="200"|
!bgcolor="#efefef" width="200"|
!bgcolor="#efefef" width="200"|
!bgcolor="#efefef" width="200"|
!bgcolor="#efefef" width="200"|
|-
| Snarøen CC, Oslo 
Skip: Eigil Ramsfjell 
Third: Sjur Loen 
Second: Morten Søgaard 
Lead: Bo Bakke  
Alternate: Gunnar Meland
|Forest Hills Trossachs CC, Aberfoyle 
Skip: Grant McPherson 
Third: Hammy McMillan 
Second: Robert Wilson 
Lead: Richard Harding  
Alternate: Billy Andres
| CK Ena, Enköping 
Skip: Göran Roxin
Third: Claes Roxin
Second: Björn Roxin
Lead: Lars-Eric Roxin 
Alternate: Anders Ehrling
| Stäfa CC, Stäfa 
Skip: Felix Luchsinger 
Third: Thomas Grendelmeier 
Second: Daniel Streiff 
Lead: Fritz Luchsinger 
| Granite CC, Seattle
Skip: Jim Vukich 
Third: Ron Sharpe 
Second: George Pepelnjak 
Lead: Gary Joraanstad 
|}

Round-robin standings

Round-robin results
Draw 1Monday, March 30, 12:00Draw 2Monday, March 30, 18:00Draw 3Tuesday, March 31, 12:00Draw 4Tuesday, March 31, 18:00Draw 5Wednesday, April 1, 12:00Draw 6Wednesday, April 1, 18:00Draw 7Thursday, April 2, 12:00Draw 8Thursday, April 2, 18:00Draw 9Friday, April 2, 9:30Tiebreaker

Playoffs

SemifinalsSaturday, April 4, 12:00Bronze medal gameSaturday, April 4, 19:30FinalSunday, April 5, 11:00''

References

External links

 

World Men's Curling Championship
Sports competitions in Vancouver
Curling in British Columbia
1987 in Canadian curling
1987 in British Columbia
March 1987 sports events in Canada
April 1987 sports events in Canada
1980s in Vancouver
International curling competitions hosted by Canada